Parichha Dam, built on the Betwa River near Parichha town, which is about 25 km from Jhansi on the Jhansi-Kanpur National Highway No. 25.  Its reservoir is used by the Parichha Thermal Power Station for electricity generation. The reservoir's impounded water that runs to Notghat Bridge, 34 km away from Jhansi - is popular for water sports. 

Jhansi is regarded as the gateway of Bundelkhand area of Uttar Pradesh. The dam, due to its scenic beauty and facility for water sports, has become a good tourist spot.

Construction
Parichha Dam was constructed during the British reign between 1881 and 1886. The dam is 1174.69 meters long and 16.77 meters high.

The dam was built mainly for irrigation purpose and for producing hydro electricity. The dam is the major source of drinking water and irrigation in the area of Bundelkhand, as this part of Uttar Pradesh faces severe water crisis.

Economy
Parichha Thermal Power Station is a coal plant, fully operational and featuring six units. Its total capacity is 1140 MWe. It operates under Uttar Pradesh Rajya Vidyut Utpadan Nigam Ltd.

Best Time to Visit
The best time to come here is from November to March.

How to Reach
Jhansi is well connected to main cities of India through rail, road, rail and air. The nearest airport is in Gwalior.

See also
 Parichha Thermal Power Station

References

Betwa River
Dams in Uttar Pradesh
Tourist attractions in Jhansi district
Year of establishment missing